The voracious shrew (Crocidura vorax) is a common and widespread species of shrew native to China, India, Laos, Thailand, and Vietnam.

References

Mammals described in 1923